Kevin Palmer (born June 21, 1987) is an American professional basketball player who last played for Akita Northern Happinets of the B.League.

College career
Palmer began his college career at Cecil College. After leading the team with 18 points per game and 80 3-pointers for the season he decided to transfer to Texas A&M-Corpus Christi.

During his senior year with the Texas A&M-Corpus Christi he averaged 19.7 points per game, 5.4 rebounds per game, and 2.4 steals per game.

College statistics

|-
| style="text-align:left;"| 2008-09
| style="text-align:left;"| Tx A&M
| 33 || 33 || 29.9 || .427 || .310 || .809|| 5.15 ||2.85  || 2.61 || 0.55 || 18.15
|-
| style="text-align:left;"| 2009-10
| style="text-align:left;"| Tx A&M
| 32 || 32 || 32.9 || .463 || .321 || .760|| 5.44 ||2.75  || 2.41 || 0.28 || 19.72
|-
|- class="sortbottom"
! style="text-align:center;" colspan=2| Career 
! 65 ||65  || 31.4 || .445 || .315 || .783 || 5.29 || 2.80 || 2.51 ||0.42 || 18.92
|-

NCAA Special Events Stats

|-
| style="text-align:left;"| 2010
| style="text-align:left;"| Portsmouth Invitational Tournament
| 3 ||    || 25.20 || .366 || .267 || .833|| 7.7 ||1.7  || 3.7 || 2.3 || 13.0
|-

NCAA Awards & Honors
NABC All-District (23) First Team - 2009, 2010
All-Southland First Team - 2009, 2010
Southland All-Tournament Team - 2009
Southland Newcomer of the Year - 2009

Professional career
On July 15, 2013, Palmer signed to play with Hapoel Eilat after playing for KAO Dramas during the 2012–13 season.

On June 6, 2015, Palmer re-signed with Hapoel Eilat after playing the 2014–2015 season with the team after that he moved to Maccabi Rishon Lezion.

On August 15, 2016, Palmer signed with the Akita Northern Happinets in Japan, replacing Richard Roby.

In the summer of 2017, Palmer played in The Basketball Tournament on ESPN for team A Few Good Men (Gonzaga Alumni). He competed for the $2 million prize, and helped take team A Few Good Men to the Super 16 round, where they then lost to Team Challenge ALS 77–60.

Career statistics

NBA Summer League Stats

|-
| align="left" |  2010-11
| align="left" | WAS
| 4 || 1 || 17.2 || .571 || .500|| .500 || 3.00 || 1.00 || 0.00 || 0.00 ||  8.00
|-

NBA Preseason Stats

|-
| align="left" |  2010-11
| align="left" | WAS
| 1 ||0 || 4.0 || .000 || .000|| .000 || 1.00 || 0.00 || 0.00 || 0.00 ||  0.00
|-

Regular season 

|-
| align="left" |  2010-11
| align="left" |AUS
| 50 || 18 || 25.4 || .459 || .270|| .846 || 5.04 || 1.34 || 1.38 || 0.56 ||  12.72
|-
| align="left" |  2011-12
| align="left" | Fukuoka
| 52 || 51 || 30.6 || .492 || .321|| .722 || 7.4 || 2.3 || 2.5 || 0.5 ||  21.6
|-
| align="left" |  2012-13
| align="left" |KAOD
| 26 || 26 || 29.3 || .429 || .238|| .792 || bgcolor="CFECEC"| 8.31* || 2.00 || bgcolor="CFECEC"| 2.38* || 0.35 ||  12.73
|-
| align="left" |  2013-14
| align="left" | Eilat
| 37 || 28 || 29.2 || .472 || .326|| .735 || 7.86 || 2.68 || 2.81 || 0.62 ||  12.43
|-
| align="left" |  2014-15
| align="left" | Eilat
| 34 || 28 || 29.2 || .460 || .377|| .798 || 6.00 || 1.97 || 1.74 || 0.35 ||  11.06
|-
| align="left"  style="background-color:#afe6ba; border: 1px solid gray"align="left" |  2015-16†
| align="left" | Rishon LeZion/Eilat
| 48 || 15 || 21.5 || .408 || .340|| .733 || 4.02 || 1.52 || 1.48 || 0.23 ||  7.08
|-
|style="background-color:#FFCCCC" align="left" | 2016-17
|align="left" | Akita
| 29 || 11 || 19.0 || .433 || .346 || .667 || 5.0 || 1.9 || 1.6 || 0.2 ||  12.0 
|-

Playoffs 

|-
|style="text-align:left;"|2011-12
|style="text-align:left;"|Fukuoka
| 2 ||  || 34.5 || .488 || .333 || .615 || 10.0 || 2.5 || 5.0 || 0.0 || 26.0
|-
|style="text-align:left;"|2013-14
|style="text-align:left;"|Eilat 
| 8 ||  || 34.0 || .487 || .343 || .875 || 9.1 || 4.1 || 2.3 || 0.6 || 15.4
|-
|style="text-align:left;"|2014-15
|style="text-align:left;"|Eilat 
| 11 ||  || 25.5 || .366 || .351 || .882 || 6.1 || 2.0 || 1.6 || 0.2 || 9.4
|-
|style="text-align:left;"|2015-16
|style="text-align:left;"|Rishon LeZion 
| 7 ||  || 13.0 || .300 || .308 || .583 || 2.3 || 1.0 || 0.6 || 0.0 || 3.3
|-

International Awards & Honors
Greek HEBA A1 Round 20 MVP - 2012-2013
Greek HEBA A1 Round 22 MVP - 2012-2013
Israeli BSL 1st Team - 2013-2014

Trivia
His hero is Carmelo Anthony.
 He is honored to be decorated on the wall at the new arena of Texas A&M–Corpus Christi Islanders.

Personal life
Palmer is the cousin of Juan and Jermaine Dixon,  basketball players.

References

External links
Highlights 2016
 
 

1987 births
Living people
Akita Northern Happinets players
American expatriate basketball people in Greece
American expatriate basketball people in Israel
American expatriate basketball people in Japan
American men's basketball players
Austin Spurs players
Basketball players from Baltimore
Hapoel Eilat basketball players
Junior college men's basketball players in the United States
K.A.O.D. B.C. players
Maccabi Rishon LeZion basketball players
Rizing Zephyr Fukuoka players
Texas A&M–Corpus Christi Islanders men's basketball players
Small forwards